The following is a list of 2019 box office number-one films in China.

See also
List of Chinese films of 2019

References

2019
China
2019 in Chinese cinema